There are currently 134 batters and 51 records in the .400 Batting Average Club:

 Note every player on the list played four seasons (except those currently with one year eligibility remaining) of at least 30 at-bats.

Progression

Jill Justin eclipsed the original batting average record held by Yvette Cannon. After just three seasons, Justin was hitting a combined .475 (192/404). She ended her career playing in a doubleheader sweep of the DePaul Blue Demons (the Huskies outscored the Blue Demons 9-1) on May 5, 1989.

Since the conclusion of Justin's competitive days, four other collegiate batters have surpassed her single career batting average record. However, none of them played all four eligible seasons but at least two of a minimum 250 at-bats (the NCAA Division I career parameter):

Stacy Cowen       – .530 (160/302); Manhattan Jaspers, 1991–1992

Kelly Knight      – .489 (131/268); Delaware State Hornets, 1993–1995

Patricia Del Real – .473 (132/279); Jackson State Tigers & Alabama State Hornets, 2002–2004

Koteria Harris    – .468 (150/320); Alcorn State Braves, 1997–1999.

Hits

In addition, there are currently 20 hitters in the .400 batting average club that amassed at least 330 hits in their career:

Alison McCutcheon – 405; Laura Berg – 396; Natasha Watley – 395; Nicole Barber – 379; Amy Chellevold – 371; Kelly Kretschman – 368; Chelsea Bramlett – 359; Nicole Giordano – 359; Robyne Yorke – 357; Raven Chavanne – 355; Caitlin Lowe – 351; Tiff Tootle – 351; Lauren Bauer – 349; Amber Jackson – 348; Kayla Braud – 344; Brittany Rogers – 343; Jessica Falca – 341; Leah O'Brien – 338; Brittany Lastrapes – 337; Cortni Emanuel - 331.

Records & Milestones

Sara Graziano set the NCAA record for batting average by hitting .588 in 1994; Robin Francisco made the list despite hitting a club low .263 in 1986. La'Tosha Williams owns the freshman class record for batting average with a .521 mark set in 1993. Graziano also had the best hit streak in NCAA history during 43 consecutive games from April 8, 1993 – March 24, 1994. Lauren Bauer achieved a 1.000 batting average with the NCAA second-best perfect game at the plate by going 6/6 on May 6, 2000. Alison McCutcheon tallied 132 base knocks in 1997 for a .534 average and the NCAA record for season hits. Nina Lindenberg hit 29 doubles for another all-time record and hit .507 in 1996. Jen Yee accumulated the best slugging percentage in 2010 at 1.270% and a .567 average.

Along with Graziano in 1994, Yee in 2010, Torrian Wright (.566 in 2015), Janae Jefferson (.554 in 2020) and Tatyana Forbes (.537 in 2020) rank top-10 all-time for NCAA season batting average. Also with Graziano in 1994, Williams in 1993, Yee in 2010, Wright in 2015, Robin Francisco (.474 in 1984 ), Jill Justin (.503 in 1987 & .484 in 1988), Meg Thompson (.483 in 1990), Crystal Boyd (.513 in 1992), Jen Weaver (.514 in 1996), Tanisha Kemp (.519 in 1998), Jessica Mendoza (.474 in 2000), Oli Keohohou (.458 in 2001), Stacey Nuveman (.528 in 2002), Amber Jackson (.490 in 2003), Autumn Champion (.488 in 2004), Kaitlin Cochran (.492 in 2007), Stephanie Thompson (.504 in 2011), Courtney Ceo (.493 in 2014), Lexie Elkins (.509 in 2016), Kacie Burnett (.487 in 2017), Courtney Cashman (.507 in 2019) and Kayla Kowalik (.495 in 2021) all led those NCAA years in average.

Finally, McCutcheon (.450 in 1996) & 1997, Lindenberg (.449 in 1998), Nuveman (.445 in 1999), Champion (.408 in 2006), Cochran (.439 in 2008), Amy Chellevold (.379 in 1993 & .504 in 1994), Jenny Dalton (.318 in 1993, .434 in 1994 & .469 in 1996), Leah O'Brien (.374 in 1993, .416 in 1994 & .467 in 1997), Laura Berg (.457 in 1998), Lauren Bauer (.426 in 2001), Nicole Giordano (.393 in 2001), Natasha Watley (.481 in 2003), Caitlin Lowe (.424 in 2006 & .414 in 2007), Kayla Braud (.340 in 2012) and Jocelyn Alo (.475 in 2021) all won national championships in those years; O'Brien also set the Women's College World Series record for batting average at .750 in 1994. For their careers, Nuveman and McCutcheon (Pac-12), Bramlett (SEC), Kacie Burnett (Big Sky), Sammy Marshall (Summit), Morgan Zerkle (USA), Jeanne Weinsheim (WCC), Sierra Romero (Big Ten), Jenny Topping (Big West in three seasons with .442 average), Thompson (Ivy), Janae Jefferson (Big 12), Keohohou (MWC in three seasons with a .436 average), Linda Rush (CAA), Katie Lacour (Southland), Kim Miller (Patriot), Courtney Cashman (America East), Lexi Watts (Horizon), Katie Keller (MAC), Leslie Sims (MVC), Lexi Osowski (OVC), Lindenberg (WAC in three seasons with a .440 average), Jen Yee (ACC in two seasons with .426 average), Graziano (Big South in two seasons with .522 average) and Elkins (Sun Belt in three seasons with a .430 average) all own these conference career batting titles.

References

Links

NCAA Division I softball career 200 RBIs list
NCAA Division I softball career 50 home runs list

College softball in the United States lists